The 2013–14 Atlas season was the 67th professional season of Mexico's top-flight football league. The season is split into two tournaments—the Torneo Apertura and the Torneo Clausura—each with identical formats and each contested by the same eighteen teams. Atlas began their season on July 19, 2013 against Club Tijuana, Atlas played their homes games on Saturdays at 9:00pm local time. Atlas did not qualify to the final phase in the Apertura and Clausura tournaments.

Tornero Apertura

Squad

Regular season

Apertura 2013 results

Goalscorers

Results

Results summary

Apertura 2013 Copa MX

Group stage

Apertura results

Quarter-finals

Semi-finals

Final

Goalscorers

Tornero Clausura

First-team squad

As of 9 November 2013.

Regular season

Clausura 2014 results

Goalscorers

Results

Results summary

Clausura 2014 Copa MX

Group stage

Clausura results

Goalscorers

Club Atlas seasons
Mexican football clubs 2013–14 season